Gỏi (Nộm in Northern Vietnam) is the indigenous salad of Vietnamese cuisine. It is to be distinguished from  sa lát (from the French for salad), and sa lát Nga ("Russian salad") found in Western style restaurants. 

This salad is a combination of a variety of fresh vegetables, grated turnip, kohlrabi, cabbage, or papaya, and slices of cucumber often with meat - either grated, boiled, lean pork, beef, shrimp or small fry. Other ingredients and condiments include spice, herbs, and peanut. The salad is mixed, soaked in vinegar, sugar, garlic, chili pepper, and seasoned with salt.

One of the best known is gỏi gà, chicken salad. Other varieties include bánh đúc nộm salad made with bánh đúc, gỏi bò khô dried beef salad with Vietnamese balm, the popular gỏi đu đủ papaya salad and  gỏi tôm prawn salad and local specialities such as rice-paddy eel salad, gỏi nhệch.

See also
 List of salads

References

External links
 Vietnam Tasty - Nộm
 Package Vietnam - Food and Drinks - Nộm Salad

Vietnamese cuisine
Salads